Adar (from Akkadian adaru) is the sixth month of the civil year and the twelfth month of the religious year on the Hebrew calendar, roughly corresponding to the month of March in the Gregorian calendar. It is a month of 29 days.

Names and Leap Years
The month's name, like all the others from the Hebrew calendar, was adopted during the Babylonian captivity. In the Babylonian calendar the name was Araḫ Addaru or Adār ('Month of Adar').

In leap years, it is preceded by a 30-day intercalary month named Adar Aleph (Aleph being the first letter of the Hebrew alphabet), also known as "Adar Rishon" (First Adar) or "Adar I", and it is then itself called Adar Bet (Bet being the second letter of the Hebrew alphabet, also known as "Adar Sheni" (Second Adar or "Adar II"). Occasionally instead of Adar I and Adar II, "Adar" and "Ve'Adar" are used (Ve means 'and' thus: And-Adar). Adar I and II occur during February–March on the Gregorian calendar.

Customs
During the Second Temple period, there was a Jewish custom to make a public proclamation on the first day of the lunar month Adar, reminding the people that they are to prepare their annual monetary offering to the Temple treasury, known as the half-Shekel.

Based on a line in the Mishnah declaring that Purim must be celebrated in Adar II in a leap year (Megillah 1:4), Adar I is considered the "extra" month.  As a result, someone born in Adar during a non leap year would celebrate their birthday in Adar II during a leap year. However, someone born during either Adar in a leap year will celebrate their birthday during Adar in a non-leap year, except that someone born on 30 Adar I will celebrate their birthday on 1 Nisan in a non-leap year because Adar in a non-leap year has only 29 days.

Holidays
 7 Adar (II in leap years) – 7th of Adar – some fast on this day in memory of the death of Moses
 13 Adar (II in leap years) – Fast of Esther – on 11 Adar when the 13th falls on Shabbat – (Fast Day)
 14 Adar (II in leap years) – Purim
 14 Adar I (does not exist in non-leap years; Karaites celebrate in Adar II) – Purim Katan
 15 Adar (II in leap years) – Shushan Purim – celebration of Purim in walled cities existing during the time of Joshua
 17 Adar (II in leap years) – Yom Adar celebration feast

In Jewish history

 1 Adar (circa 1313 BCE) – Plague of Darkness, the ninth plague upon the Egyptians (Exodus 10:23).  This started on the 1st of Adar, six weeks before the Exodus.
 1 Adar [II] (1167/4 CE) – Death of the Ibn Ezra
 1 Adar (circa 1663) – Death of the Shach
 2 Adar (598 BCE) – Jerusalem falls to Nebuchadnezzar and Jeconiah is captured.
 2 Adar (1941 CE) - Death of Rabbi Yaakov Yehezkiya Greenwald of Pupa
 3 Adar (515 BCE) – Second Temple completed
 4 Adar (1307) – Maharam's body ransomed 14 years after his death by Alexander ben Shlomo (Susskind) Wimpfen.
 4 Adar (1796) – Death of Rabbi Leib Sarah's, a disciple of the Rabbi Israel Baal Shem Tov. One of the "hidden tzaddikim," Rabbi Leib spent his life wandering from place to place to raise money for the ransoming of imprisoned Jews and the support of other hidden tzaddikim.
 4 Adar [II] (1992 CE) Death of Menachem Begin
 5 Adar (1st century CE) – Lulianos and Paphos voluntarily gave themselves up to be killed, in order to save innocent Jewish lives in Laodicea.
 7 Adar (1393 BCE) – Birth of Moses
 7 Adar (1273 BCE) – Death of Moses
 7 Adar (1828) – Death of Rebbe Isaac Taub of Kalov, founder of the Kalover Hasidic dynasty,  and a student of Rabbi Leib Sarah's.
 9 Adar (1st century BCE) – Academic dissension between Beit Hillel and Beit Shammai, erupted into a violent and destructive conflict over a vote on 18 legal matters leading to the death of 3,000 students. The day was later declared a fast day by the Shulchan Aruch, however, it was never observed as such.
 11 Adar (18th century) – Death of Reb Eliezer Lipman (Elezer Lippe), father of the prominent Chassidic Rebbes Rabbi Elimelech of Lizhensk and Rabbi Zusha of Hanipol.
 13 Adar (474 BCE) – War between Jews and their enemies in Persia (Book of Esther, chapter 9).
 13 Adar (161 BCE) – Yom Nicanor – The Maccabees defeated Greek Syrian general Nicanor at the Battle of Adasa during the Maccabean Revolt.
 13 Adar (1895–1986) – Death of Rabbi Moshe Feinstein
 14 Adar (474 BCE) – Purim victory celebrated in the Persian Empire
 15 Adar (474 BCE) – Purim Victory Celebrated in Shushan
 15 Adar (1st century CE) – Jerusalem Gate Day – King Agrippa I (circa 21 CE) began construction of a gate for the wall of Jerusalem; the day used to be celebrated as a holiday.
 17 Adar (522 BCE) – Yom Adar – the day the Jewish people left Persia following the Purim story
 18 Adar [1953] - Death of Josef Stalin; brings to a stop the Doctors' Plot
 20 Adar (1st century BCE) – Choni the Circle Maker prays for rain (Talmud, Taanit 23a)
 20 Adar (1616 CE) – 'Purim Vinz': downfall of Vinzenz Fettmilch and triumphant return of the Jews of Frankfurt under Imperial protection. The day was established as a community Purim for generations and to this day the Washington Heights community does not recite Tachanun on this day.
 20 Adar (1640) – Death of the "Bach"
 21 Adar (Adar II, 1786) – Death of Rabbi Elimelech of Lizhensk
 23 Adar (circa 1312 BCE) – Mishkan assembled for the first time; "Seven Days of Training" begin.
 23 Adar (1866) – Death of Yitzchak Meir Alter, first Rebbe of Ger
 24 Adar (1817) – The Blood Libel, the accusation that Jews murdered Christian children for their blood, declared false by Czar Alexander I. Nevertheless, nearly a hundred years later the accusation was officially leveled against Mendel Beilis in Kyiv.
 25 Adar (561 BCE) – Death of Nebuchadnezzar (Jeremiah 52:31).
 25 Adar (1761) – Death of Rabbi Abraham Gershon of Kitov the brother-in-law and leading foe-turned-disciple of the Baal Shem Tov.
 27 Adar (561 BCE) – Death of Zedekiah in Babylonian captivity. Meroduch, Nebuchadnezzar's son and successor, freed him (and his nephew Jeconiah) on the 27th of Adar, but Zedekiah died that same day.
 28 Adar (from the 2nd century onwards) – Talmudic holiday to commemorate the rescinding of a Roman decree against Torah study, ritual circumcision, and keeping the Shabbat. The decree was revoked through the efforts of Rabbi Yehudah ben Shamu'a and his colleagues. (Megillat Taanit, a baraita on this matter can still be found in Ta'anit 18a and Rosh Hashanah 19a)
 28 Adar (1524) – the Jews of Cairo were saved from the plot of Ahmad Pasha, who sought revenge against the Jewish minister Abraham de Castro who had informed Selim II of Ahmad's plan to cede from the Ottoman Empire. To this day, Adar 28th is considered the Purim of Cairo, with festivities including a special Megilah reading.

See also
 Adar Gandelsman – Miss Universe Israel 2017
 Adar or Ada is Sindarin for "father".
 Azar or Adhar is the name for the month of March in the Levant.
 Arabic names of calendar months
 Jewish astrology

References

External links
 This Month in Jewish History
 Resources on the Month of Adar
 The month of Adar and the holiday of Purim, minhagim (customs) and halachot (laws) by Rabbi Eliezer Melamed

 
Months of the Hebrew calendar